The 1999–2000 League of Ireland Premier Division was the 15th season of the League of Ireland Premier Division. The division was made up of 12 teams. Shelbourne won the title.

Regular season
The season saw each team playing three rounds of games, playing every other team three times, totalling 33 games.

Final Table

Results

Matches 1–22

Matches 23–33

Promotion/relegation play-off
Waterford United who finished in tenth place played off against Kilkenny City, the third placed team from the 1999–2000 League of Ireland First Division.

1st Leg

2nd Leg 

Kilkenny City won 2–0 on aggregate and were promoted to the Premier Division.

See also
 1999–2000 League of Ireland First Division

References

Ireland
1999–2000 in Republic of Ireland association football
League of Ireland Premier Division seasons